Ndyuka may refer to:

 Ndyuka language, a creole language of Suriname, spoken by the Ndyuka people
 Ndyuka people, a Maroon ethnic group who live in the eastern part of Suriname

Language and nationality disambiguation pages